Ajmiriganj is an upazila of Habiganj District in the Division of Sylhet, Bangladesh.

History 
In 1254, the Governor of Bengal Malik Ikhtiyaruddin Iuzbak invaded the Azmardan Raj (present-day Ajmiriganj). He defeated the local Raja. This was long before the Conquest of Sylhet in 1303. Jalsukha Krishna Govinda Public High School was established in 1876. In the 1800s, a Sufi saint who was stationed at the Ajmer Sharif Dargah of Moinuddin Chishti, migrated to modern-day Ajmiriganj. His name was Syed Ishaq Chishti, and the locals referred to him as Ajmiri Baba (Baba of Ajmer). After the death of Ishaq, a government gazette notified that Abidabad thana would be renamed Ajmiriganj (Ganj of Ajmiri) in honour of Ishaq in circa 1907. Ajmiriganj amalgamated Bir Charan Govt Pilot High School was established in 1930. In 1983, Ajmiriganj thana was turned into an upazila. The names were changed from Aijadam > Ajmardan > Aijmadam > Abidabaad > Ajmiriganj.

During the Bangladesh Liberation War of 1971, an eighteen hour long encounter between the freedom fighters and the Pakistan Army took place on 16 November. 11 innocent villagers as well as freedom fighter Jagat Joity Das were killed.

Geography
It has a total area of 223.98 km2. Ajmiriganj Bazar (main town), on the other hand, consists of 2 mouzas, with an area of 5.73 km2. The town has one Dak-Bungalow and a number of buildings dating from as early as the 1800s; some financed by the Maharaja of Tripura.

Demographics

According to the 2011 Bangladesh census, Ajmiriganj Upazila had 21,293 households and a population of 114,265, 13.0% of whom lived in urban areas. 14.8% of the population was under the age of 5. The literacy rate (age 7 and over) was 37.1%, compared to the national average of 51.8%.

Administration
Ajmiriganj Upazila is divided into Ajmiriganj Municipality and five union parishads: Ajmiriganj, Badalpur, Jolsuka, Kakailsao, and Shibpasha. The union parishads are subdivided into 68 mauzas and 133 villages.

Ajmiriganj is part of the Habiganj-2 constituency in the Bangladesh Parliament.

See also
Upazilas of Bangladesh
Districts of Bangladesh
Divisions of Bangladesh

References

Upazilas of Habiganj District